Porites cylindrica, commonly known as hump coral, is a stony coral of the subclass Hexacorallia.

Description
P. cylindrica is a hermatypic (reef-building) coral that can grow to a few square meters wide and form micro-atolls. They are typically cream colored, yellow, blue, pale brown or green.

Distribution and habitat

P. cylindrica is common to abundant in shallow water areas 1–11 meters deep. They have also been observed 20 meters below surface waters. P. Cylindrica is found in back reefs and lagoons located in the waters of the oceanic West Pacific, Australia, the South China Sea, Japan, South-east Asia and the Indian Ocean.

References

Poritidae
Corals described in 1846